Cholenice is a municipality and village in Jičín District in the Hradec Králové Region of the Czech Republic. It has about 200 inhabitants.

History
The first written mention of Cholenice is from 1378.

References

Villages in Jičín District